Roas is a surname. Notable people with the surname include:

 David Roas (born 1965), Spanish writer and literary critic
 Moshe Roas (born 1981), Israeli artist